The Hutchings Homestead, also known as the Cannon Ball House, is located in Springfield, Union County, New Jersey, United States. The homestead was built in 1741 and was added to the National Register of Historic Places on September 16, 1977.

External links 
 Revolutionary War New Jersey

See also 
 National Register of Historic Places listings in Union County, New Jersey

References

Houses completed in 1741
Houses on the National Register of Historic Places in New Jersey
Houses in Union County, New Jersey
National Register of Historic Places in Union County, New Jersey
Springfield Township, Union County, New Jersey
New Jersey Register of Historic Places